Chaos Walking is a 2021 American science-fiction dystopian action-thriller film directed by Doug Liman and written by Patrick Ness and Christopher Ford. It is based on Ness's science fiction trilogy Chaos Walking, adapting its first book, 2008's The Knife of Never Letting Go. It stars Daisy Ridley, Tom Holland, Mads Mikkelsen, Demián Bichir, Cynthia Erivo, Nick Jonas and David Oyelowo. It follows a young man who lives in a dystopian world without women, where all living creatures can hear each other's thoughts in streams of images, words and sounds, called "Noise". When a woman crash-lands on the planet, he protects her from danger.

Announced in 2011, the film underwent several rewrites based on an initial draft by Charlie Kaufman, with Jamie Linden, John Lee Hancock, Gary Spinelli, Lindsey Beer, Ford, and Ness revising it further. Liman was later announced as director in 2016, and principal photography began in 2017. Originally set to release on March 1, 2019, it was removed from the schedule to accommodate the film's reshoots in April 2019 after poor test screenings.

The film premiered in South Korea on February 24, 2021, and in the United States on March 5, 2021. It received generally negative reviews from critics who derided the film's underdeveloped plot, uneven pacing, lack of character development, Ridley and Holland's chemistry, and deviation from the source material's themes and message. The film was also a commercial failure, grossing $27 million worldwide against its $100 million budget and resulting in a write-down for Lionsgate.

Plot
In 2257 AD, the colonists of the planet New World, all men, have been afflicted with a condition called the Noise, which causes everyone to see and hear each other's thoughts. The colonists were involved in a bitter war with the native humanoid species referred to as The Spackle, a war that ostensibly killed all female colonists, while half the men survived. Todd Hewitt lives in Prentisstown with his adoptive fathers, Ben Moore and Cillian Boyd. Other residents include the preacher Aaron, the town's mayor David Prentiss, and his son Davy. Prentiss has learned to control his Noise, making his thoughts difficult to see and hear. A spaceship that lost contact with the First Colony approaches New World and a scout ship is sent to investigate the planet, but it crashes. One day, Todd discovers someone stealing something and chases the thief, only to come upon the crash site.

Todd returns to the town and tries to keep quiet, but the other men hear and see his thoughts about the crashed ship. They head to investigate the crash scene and scavenge some parts of the ship, but find no survivors. While Todd is alone, he meets Viola, the ship's only survivor. He is shocked to see a girl, as he has never seen one before. The men from Prentisstown capture Viola and she is brought to the mayor's home, where she is questioned about where she came from. Prentiss explains to her what the Noise is and what has happened on their planet. While he leaves to go speak to the men, Davy is charged with keeping an eye on her. Davy unwittingly toys with one of Viola's gadgets, which causes it to shoot large holes in the walls, helping Viola escape.

During her escape, Viola overhears Prentiss talking about preventing her from contacting the colony's mothership, intercepting their landing, killing them while they are still under cryosleep, and scavenging the ship. Viola hides in Todd's family's barn, where Todd eventually finds her. Todd tries to hide Viola, when one of Prentiss' men arrives looking for her. Ben tells Todd about another settlement called Farbranch and says Viola will be safe there.

Viola escapes on a motorcycle while Todd chases after her on one of the horses. Prentiss and the men arrive at the farm, demanding Viola back as they believe she is a spy. Davy kills Cillian, and Ben is forced to join them. Meanwhile, Todd catches up to Viola and the two begin a journey to Farbranch, accompanied by Todd's dog, Manchee. During the journey, Viola reveals to Todd that she is from a large Colony Ship carrying over four thousand passengers and that her parents died during the 64 year-long journey from Earth to New World. Todd reveals he never knew his real parents. When they encounter a Spackle, Todd attempts to kill it in self-defense, but Viola stops him because it does not appear to be dangerous. They arrive at Farbranch, a town inhabited by men, women and children, some of whom are displeased with Todd's presence, because he is from Prentisstown.

Todd discovers his mother's diary, but Viola reads it to him because he cannot. The diary reveals that the women were not killed by the native aliens, but rather by Prentiss and the men of Prentisstown. The men could not stand not knowing the thoughts of the women, when they could hear theirs, which drove them crazy. Angered, Todd realizes that everything he had been told was a lie. Prentiss and his men arrive, again demanding Viola. Ben tries to get Todd to surrender Viola, but Todd is upset at him for lying. Ben uses his Noise to create an image of Viola to distract Prentiss and his men, while Todd and Viola escape. Aaron chases them. They come upon a boat, and, as they escape, Aaron kills Manchee, further enraging Todd.

The next day, Viola and Todd arrive at the ruins of the first colony ship. They enter it and try to send a signal to the colony ship, but the antenna is damaged, so Todd attempts to repair it. When Prentiss and his men arrive, Todd surrenders himself, as Prentiss is holding Ben hostage. Aaron goes inside to kill Viola, but she immolates him with one of her gadgets. Todd appears, but Prentiss shoots Ben. Todd goes to him and, unknown to Prentiss, Ben gives him a knife. Todd engages Prentiss, but he uses illusions of himself to distract Todd and shoots him. As he is about to kill Todd, Todd uses illusions of his mother and other women, calling Prentiss a coward. Viola pushes Prentiss off the cliff ledge to his death. The colony ship appears in the sky, causing Davy and the remaining Prentisstown men to flee.

Todd wakes up in the colony ship's medical room, almost fully healed. Viola takes him to meet other colonists.

Cast
 Tom Holland as Todd Hewitt
 Daisy Ridley as Viola Eade
 Mads Mikkelsen as Mayor David Prentiss
 Demián Bichir as Ben Moore
 Cynthia Erivo as Mathilde 'Hildy'
 Nick Jonas as David 'Davy' Prentiss, Jr.
 Ray McKinnon as Matthew Lyle
 Kurt Sutter as Cillian Boyd
 David Oyelowo as Aaron
 Bethany Anne Lind as Karyssa Hewitt
 Camren Bicondova as Lola Eade

Additionally, dog actors Wiston and Lamborghini both portray Manchee the Dog. Óscar Jaenada was cast as Wilf, but all of his scenes were eventually cut from the film. Harrison Osterfield also makes a uncredited appearance as a man from Farnbranch.

Production
In October 2011, Lionsgate acquired worldwide distribution rights for a film adaptation of Patrick Ness's Chaos Walking trilogy, to be produced by Doug Davison's production company Quadrant Pictures. In 2012, Lionsgate hired Charlie Kaufman to write the first draft of the screenplay. Kaufman subsequently left, a fact he himself confirmed during a Q&A panel at the 2016 Karlovy Vary International Film Festival. His draft was later revised by Jamie Linden, Lindsey Beer, Gary Spinelli, John Lee Hancock, Christopher Ford and Ness himself. Deadline reported in 2013 that Robert Zemeckis was being considered as director, but this did not eventuate. By June 10, 2016, Doug Liman was in talks to direct the film. On August 4, 2016, it was reported that Daisy Ridley had joined the cast. She was a fan of the books, and it was announced she would play Viola. On November 28, 2016, Tom Holland joined the cast to play Todd.

On July 20, 2017, it was announced that Mads Mikkelsen had joined the cast for the film, as the villainous mayor. Demián Bichir, Kurt Sutter, Nick Jonas and David Oyelowo joined the cast in August 2017. Cynthia Erivo joined in September 2017. In October 2017, Óscar Jaenada joined the cast.

Principal photography began in Montreal, Quebec on August 7, 2017, with additional financing from Bron Creative. Filming also took place in Scotland and Iceland. Principal photography wrapped up in November 2017.

In April 2018, it was reported that several weeks of reshoots were scheduled for late 2018 or early 2019, following poor test screenings. Owing to Ridley's filming commitments to Star Wars: The Rise of Skywalker and Holland's to Spider-Man: Far From Home, the reshoots could not begin until April 2019, with Fede Álvarez directing. The reshoots took place in Atlanta and lasted through May, adding an additional $15 million to the film's budget and bringing the total cost to $100 million. In September 2020, Ness and Ford were given final credit for the screenplay.

Release

Theatrical
The film premiered in the United States on March 5, 2021, with an additional IMAX release, following a debut theatrical release in South Korea on February 24, 2021. It was previously scheduled to be released on March 1, 2019, but it was delayed to accommodate the film's reshoots. It was then scheduled to be released on January 22, 2021, but was delayed again to March due to the COVID-19 pandemic.

Home media
A month after the film's theatrical release in North America, it was released on PVOD on April 2, 2021, in both the United States and the United Kingdom, where theaters were closed due to lockdown in response to COVID-19 surges. It streamed on Hulu on August 27, 2021, and its Blu-ray copies were released on May 25, 2021, featuring 45 minutes of deleted scenes.

Reception

Box office
The film grossed $13.3 million in the United States and Canada, and $13.8 million in other territories, for a worldwide total of $27.1 million, against a production budget of $100 million.

In North America, it was released alongside Raya and the Last Dragon and Boogie, and made $1.3 million from 1,980 theaters on its first day of release. It went on to debut to $3.7 million, finishing third at the box office. Deadline Hollywood wrote that the film was "poised to lose money" for Lionsgate, and Lionsgate "has already written off the pic's loss." The film made $2.3 million (–40%) in its second weekend, remaining in third. After its third weekend, where it grossed $1.2 million, Variety said the film would "result in a massive write-down for the studio."

In South Korea, the film grossed $503,140 in its opening weekend, finishing fifth at the box office.

Critical response
Reviews for the film criticized it for "poor execution and conventional, underdeveloped characters." The site's critics consensus reads: "Chaos Walking sets out on a potentially interesting path, but this dystopian adventure badly bungles its premise and limps toward the finish." According to Metacritic, which calculated a weighted average score of 38 out of 100 based on 32 critics, the film received "generally unfavorable reviews". Audiences polled by CinemaScore gave the film an average grade of "B" on an A+ to F scale, while PostTrak reported 70% of audience members gave it a positive score, with 43% saying they would definitely recommend it.

Writing for IndieWire, David Ehrlich gave the film a grade of C− and said, "Despite its strange conceit and a few buried hints as to what a more courageous film might have done with it, the movie version of the first Chaos Walking book (published as 'The Knife of Never Letting Go') is such a dull and ordinary thing that it can't help but get engulfed by the shadow of its own missed potential." Peter Debruge of Variety said the film "quickly wears out its welcome" and wrote: "When it comes to confrontations, the movie wimps out, putting more effort into New World-building than in the largely generic characters who populate it."

References

External links
  at Lionsgate
 

2021 adventure films
2021 science fiction action films
3 Arts Entertainment films
2020s American films
2020s dystopian films
2020s English-language films
2020s science fiction adventure films
American dystopian films
American post-apocalyptic films
American science fiction action films
American science fiction adventure films
Bron Studios films
Films based on American thriller novels
Films based on British novels
Films based on science fiction novels
Films based on young adult literature
Films directed by Doug Liman
Films postponed due to the COVID-19 pandemic
Films scored by Marco Beltrami
Films set in the 23rd century
Films set in the future
Films set on fictional planets
Films shot in Atlanta
Films shot in Iceland
Films shot in Montreal
Films shot in Scotland
Films with screenplays by Christopher Ford (screenwriter)
Films with screenplays by Patrick Ness
IMAX films
Lionsgate films